Steroid 21-hydroxylase (also known as steroid 21-monooxygenase, cytochrome P450C21, 21α-hydroxylase and less commonly 21β-hydroxylase) is an enzyme that hydroxylates steroids at the C21 position and is involved in biosynthesis of aldosterone and cortisol. The enzyme converts progesterone and 17α-hydroxyprogesterone into 11-deoxycorticosterone and 11-deoxycortisol, respectively, within metabolic pathways that ultimately lead to aldosterone and cortisol. Deficiency in the enzyme may cause congenital adrenal hyperplasia.

Steroid 21-hydroxylase is a member of the cytochrome P450 family of monooxygenase enzymes that uses an iron containing heme cofactor to oxidize substrates. The enzyme is localized in endoplasmic reticulum membranes of adrenal cortex, and is encoded by the  gene in humans, which is located near the CYP21A1P pseudogene with high degree of sequence similarity. This similarity makes it difficult to analyze the gene at the molecular level, and sometimes leads to loss-of-function mutations of the gene due to intergenic exchange of DNA.

Function 

The steroid 21-hydroxylase enzyme hydroxylates steroids at the C21 position. The enzyme catalyzes the chemical reaction in which the hydroxyl group (-OH) is added at the C21 position of the steroid biomolecule.

The enzyme is a member of the cytochrome P450 superfamily of monooxygenase enzymes. The cytochrome P450 enzymes catalyze many reactions involved in drug metabolism and synthesis of cholesterol, steroids and other lipids.

21-hydroxylase is localized in microsomes of endoplasmic reticulum membranes within adrenal cortex. It is one of three microsomal steroidogenic P450 enzymes, the others being 17-hydroxylase and aromatase.

21-hydroxylase is essential for the biosynthesis of cortisol and aldosterone.

Structure 
21-hydroxylase, as a member of the cytochrome P450 family of monooxygenase enzymes, contains a conserved core of a four α-helix bundle, two additional alpha helices, two sets of β-sheets, and a heme cofactor binding loop.  Each subunit in the human enzyme consists of a total of 13 α-helices and 9 β-strands that folds into a triangular prism-like tertiary structure. The iron(III) heme group that defines the active site resides in the center of each subunit. The human enzyme binds one substrate at a time. In contrast, the well-characterized bovine enzyme can bind two substrates. The human and bovine enzyme share 80% amino acid sequence identity, but are structurally different, particularly in loop regions, and also evident in secondary structure elements.

Mechanism 

21-Hydroxylase is a cytochrome P450 enzyme that is notable for its substrate specificity and relatively high catalytic efficiency. Variations of the 21-hydroxylase enzyme can be found in all vertebrates.

Like other cytochrome P450 enzymes, 21-hydroxylase participates in the cytochrome P450 catalytic cycle and engages in one-electron transfer with NADPH-P450 reductase. 21-Hydroxylase is highly specific for hydroxylation of progesterone and 17-hydroxyprogesterone. This is in marked contrast to the evolutionarily and functionally related P450 enzyme 17-hydroxylase, which has a broad range of substrates.

The chemical reaction in which 21-hydroxylase catalyzes the addition of hydroxyl (-OH) to the C21 position of progesterone, 17α-hydroxyprogesterone and 21-desoxycortisone was first described in 1952.

Studies of the human enzyme expressed in yeast initially classified 17-hydroxyprogesterone as the preferred substrate for 21-hydroxylase, however, later analysis of the purified human enzyme found a lower KM and greater catalytic efficiency for progesterone over 17-hydroxyprogesterone.

The catalytic efficiency of 21-hydroxylase for conversion of progesterone in humans is approximately 1.3 x 107 M−1s−1 at 37 °C. This makes it the most catalytically efficient P450 enzyme of those reported to date, and catalytically more efficient than the closely related bovine 21-hydroxylase enzyme. C-H bond breaking to create a primary carbon radical is thought to be the rate-limiting step in the hydroxylation.

Genetics 

21-hydroxylase is a protein encoded by the CYP21A2 gene in humans. A related pseudogene, CYP21A1P, is located nearby and retains 98% exonic sequence identity with the functional gene CYP21A2. Both genes are located on chromosome 6, in the major histocompatibility complex III close to the Complement component 4 genes C4A and C4B, the Tenascin X gene TNXB and STK19.

 In the mouse genome, the CYP21A2 is a pseudogene and the CYP21A1 is a functional gene. In the chicken and quail, there is only a single CYP21 gene, which locus is located between complement component C4 and TNX gene, along with CENPA.

The CYP21A2 gene travels in tandem with a pseudogene, CYP21P1, and the high degree of sequence similarity between them indicates that these two genes are evolving in tandem through intergenic exchange of DNA. The CYP21A2 gene is located within the RCCX cluster (an abbreviation composed of the names of the genes RP (a former name for STK19 serine/threonine kinase 19), C4, CYP21 and TNX), which is the most complex gene cluster in the human genome. It is part of the major histocompatibility complex class III (MHC class III), which is the most gene-dense region of the human genome, containing many genes that yet have unknown function or structure. Due to the high degree of homology between the CYP21A2 gene and the CYP21P1 pseudogene and the complexity of the locus, it is difficult to study the CYP21A2 gene at the molecular level.

Clinical significance

Congenital adrenal hyperplasia 

Genetic variants in the CYP21A2 gene cause a disturbance in the development of the enzyme, leading to congenital adrenal hyperplasia (CAH) due to 21-hydroxylase deficiency. Gene conversion events involving the functional gene and the pseudogene account for many cases of steroid 21-hydroxylase deficiency. CAH is an autosomal recessive disorder. There are multiple forms of CAH, broken down into classical and nonclassical forms based on the amount of enzyme function retained.

Complete loss of enzymatic activity causes the salt-wasting form. Variations in the structure of 21-hydroxylase are related to the clinical severity of congenital adrenal hyperplasia. Cortisol and aldosterone deficits are associated with life-threatening salt-loss (hence salt-wasting), as the steroids play roles in regulating sodium homeostasis. Simple-virilizing CAH patients (~1-2% enzyme function) maintain adequate sodium homeostasis, but exhibit other symptoms shared by the salt-wasting form, including accelerated growth in childhood and ambiguous genitalia in female neonates.

The nonclassical form is the mildest one, retaining about 20% to 50% of enzyme function. This form is associated with mild and clinically silent cortisol impairment, but an excess of androgens post-puberty.

Non-classic congenital adrenal hyperplasia 
Non-classical congenital adrenal hyperplasia caused by 21-hydroxylase deficiency (NCCAH) is a milder and late-onset congenital adrenal hyperplasia. Some people affected by the condition have no relevant signs and symptoms, while others experience symptoms of hyperandrogenism.

Women with NCCAH usually have normal female genitalia at birth. In later life, the signs and symptoms of the condition may include acne, hirsutism, male-pattern baldness, irregular menstruation, and infertility.

Fewer studies have been published about males with NCCAH comparing to those about females, because males are generally asymptomatic. Males, however, may present with acne and early balding.

While symptoms are usually diagnosed after puberty, children may present with premature adrenarche.

Research on other conditions
There is ongoing research on how Genetic variants in the CYP21A2 gene may lead do pathogenic conditions. A variant of this gene has been reported to cause autosomal dominant posterior polar cataract, suggesting that 21-hydroxylase may be involved in the extraadrenal biosynthesis of aldosterone and cortisol in the lens of the eye.

See also 
 Steroidogenic enzyme
 Cytochrome P450 oxidoreductase deficiency

References

External links 

  GeneReviews/NCBI/NIH/UW entry on 21-Hydroxylase-Deficient Congenital Adrenal Hyperplasia
  OMIM entry on 21-Hydroxylase-Deficient Congenital Adrenal Hyperplasia
 Synthesis of Desoxycorticosterone from Progesterone through 21-Hydroxylase (Image) 
 
 
 
 

Enzymes
EC 1.14.99
21
Metabolism
Human proteins